Jill Viner (1952–1996) was a bus driver known for being the first woman to drive a London bus in passenger service.

Career
Viner trained to become a bus driver at a centre in Chiswick. She started her career in 1974, when London Transport were said to be 3,200 drivers short. She was based at the Norbiton bus garage, where she worked until its closure in 1993.

Legacy
While women had previously driven buses within bus depots during the Second World War, Viner was the first women to drive a bus in service in London.

In the weeks after Viner started driving, it was reported that thirty women had applied to become bus drivers. Despite this, in the subsequent years hiring of female drivers was slow. London Transport began proactively recruiting female bus drivers in 1980, but over forty years later in 2021 it was noted that there are still relatively few female bus drivers.

See also
Hannah Dadds, first female train driver on the London Underground

References

1952 births
1996 deaths
Bus drivers
Date of birth missing
Date of death missing